Alyaksandr Alyaksandravich Shahoyka (born 27 July 1980) is a Belarusian former professional footballer.

International career
Shahoyka made his debut for Belarus on 1 March 2006 in the match against Finland during the friendly Cyprus International Football Tournament.

Honours
Belshina Bobruisk
Belarusian Premier League champion: 2001
Belarusian Cup winner: 2000–01

Gomel
Belarusian Premier League champion: 2003

External links

1980 births
Living people
Belarusian footballers
Association football defenders
Belarus international footballers
Belarusian expatriate footballers
Expatriate footballers in Ukraine
Belarusian expatriate sportspeople in Ukraine
Ukrainian Premier League players
FC Belshina Bobruisk players
FC Gomel players
FC Kryvbas Kryvyi Rih players
FC Isloch Minsk Raion players